The Von Restorff effect, also known as the "isolation effect", predicts that when multiple homogeneous stimuli are presented, the stimulus that differs from the rest is more likely to be remembered. The theory was coined by German psychiatrist and pediatrician Hedwig von Restorff (1906–1962), who, in her 1933 study, found that when participants were presented with a list of categorically similar items with one distinctive, isolated item on the list, memory for the item was improved.

The study utilized the isolation paradigm, which refers to a distinctive feature of an item in a list that differs from the others by way of dimension. Such distinctiveness, leading to the von Restorff effect, can be generated from changing the meaningfulness or physical nature of the stimulus in some way, such as in size, shape, color, spacing and underlining.

Examples 
For example, if a person examines a shopping list with one item highlighted in bright green, he or she will be more likely to remember the highlighted item than any of the others.  Additionally, in the following list of words – desk, chair, bed, table, chipmunk, dresser, stool, couch – "chipmunk" will be remembered the most as it stands out against the other words in its meaning.

Explanation 
There are different theories proposed to explain the increased performance of isolated items.  The total-time hypothesis suggests that isolated items are rehearsed for a longer time in working memory compared to non-isolated items.  Another approach offers that subjects could consider the isolated items to be in their own special category in a free-recall task, making them easier to recollect.  A separate explanation is based upon the analysis of the deep processing of similarities and differences among the items.  
Debate surrounds whether perceptual salience and differential attention are necessary to produce this effect.  Modern theory holds that the contextual incongruity of the isolate is what leads to the differential attention to this item.  Based on this assumption, an isolation effect would not be expected if the isolated item were presented prior to some consistent context, a theory that goes against von Restorff's findings.

Empirical data has shown a strong relationship between the von Restorff effect and measures of event-related potential in the brain. Specifically, evidence has shown that exposure to novel or isolated items on a list for free recall generates an ERP with a larger amplitude and this amplitude in turn predicts a higher likelihood of future recall and faster recognition of the items.

Age
There have been many studies that demonstrate and confirm the von Restorff effect in children and young adults. Another study found that college-aged students performed better when trying to remember an outstanding item in a list during an immediate memory-task whereas elderly individuals did not remember it well, suggesting a difference in processing strategies between the age groups.

In yet another study, although a significant von Restorff effect was produced amongst both age groups when manipulating font color, it was found to be smaller in older adults than younger adults. This too indicates that older people display lesser benefits for distinctive information compared to younger people.

See also 
 List of cognitive biases
 List of memory biases
 Serial position effect

References

Cognitive biases
Memory biases